Pardastlu (also Romanized as Pardastlū; also known as Bardastlū and Pardastī) is a village in Sanjabad-e Gharbi Rural District, in the Central District of Kowsar County, Ardabil Province, Iran. At the 2006 census, its population was 146, in 32 families.

References 

Tageo

Towns and villages in Kowsar County